Australia won the 1934 Ashes series against England, winning two of the matches and losing one, with the other two tests drawn. The Australian tourists were captained by Bill Woodfull, while the home side were led by Bob Wyatt, with Cyril Walters deputising for Wyatt in the first Test.

In the second Test of the series at Lord's, known as Verity's Match, left-arm spinner Hedley Verity took 15 wickets in the match to hand England their only victory in a Lord's Ashes Test in the twentieth century. The last two Tests of the series were notable for the prodigious runscoring of Bill Ponsford and Donald Bradman, who shared partnerships of at 388 at Headingley (scoring 181 and 304 respectively) and 451 at the Oval (scoring 266 and 244 respectively) in Ponsford's final Test.

One-day: Ceylon v Australians
The Australians had a stopover in Colombo en route to England and played a one-day single-innings match there against the Ceylon national team, which at that time did not have Test status.

Tour Matches

First-class Matches

Test Matches

First Test

Second Test

Third Test

Fourth Test

Fifth Test

References

External links
 CricketArchive – tour summaries

Annual reviews
 Wisden Cricketers' Almanack 1935

Further reading
 Bill Frindall, The Wisden Book of Test Cricket 1877-1978, Wisden, 1979
 Chris Harte, A History of Australian Cricket, Andre Deutsch, 1993

1934 in Australian cricket
1934 in English cricket
1934 in Ceylon
1934
1934
Sri Lankan cricket seasons from 1880–81 to 1971–72
International cricket competitions from 1918–19 to 1945
1934